Tacuara Records is an independent record label based in Buenos Aires, Argentina and founded by Cesar Canali.  The label produces a variety of electronic world music, in genres such as minimal synth, coldwave, alternative, experimental, industrial.  Tacuara Records produced former Atari Teenage Riot member Hanin Elias' South American Tour in 2013, where she played in Perú, Chile, Brazil and Argentina.  The label produces, mixes, masters, promotes and sells products aimed at European and South American consumers.

Releases

See also
Abbey Road Studios
List of record labels

References

Argentine record labels
Record labels established in 2008
2008 establishments in Argentina
Pop record labels
Electronic dance music record labels
Rock record labels
EMI